Javier Contreras is an engineer at the University of Castilla–La Mancha, Ciudad Real, Spain. He was named Fellow of the Institute of Electrical and Electronics Engineers (IEEE) in 2015 for contributions to modeling and forecasting of electricity markets.

References

External links

20th-century births
Living people
Spanish engineers
Academic staff of the University of Castilla–La Mancha
Fellow Members of the IEEE
Year of birth missing (living people)
Place of birth missing (living people)